Dansari Anasuya (born 9 July 1971), commonly known as Seethakka, is an Indian politician. She was elected to Andhra Pradesh Legislative Assembly in 2009 and Telangana Legislative Assembly in 2018 from Mulug assembly constituency. She was appointed general secretary of All India Mahila Congress in June 2018 and in August 2019 became state in-charge of Chhattisgarh Mahila Congress.

Early life and background 
Anasuya was a Naxalite before joining politics. She joined the Janashakti Naxal group when she was 14 years old in 1987. She was quickly disillusioned with the movement and exited it after an eleven-year stint. She surrendered to the police under the general amnesty plan in 1997. She then pursued her studies and became a lawyer. In 2022, she completed her PhD in political science from Osmania University.

Political career 
Anasuya first entered politics in 2004 when she joined the Telugu Desam Party and contested unsuccessfully from Mulug. She contested from it again in 2009, winning the constituency, and defeating Congress candidate Podem Veeriah by a huge margin. She lost the constituency in 2014 to TRS candidate Azmeera Chandulal.

In 2017, Anasuya left the TDP and joined the Congress, soon becoming general secretary of All India Mahila Congress and later state in-charge for Chhattisgarh Mahila Congress. She won the elections for Mulug constituency in 2018 as a Congress candidate.

Relief in Lockdown 
Anasuya had visited over 400 villages near the Telangana-Chhattisgarh border in 2020 during lockdown, providing relief to locals, distributing rice, dal etc., commodities and masks to people in need. Her efforts received tremendous support on social media, “I am doing this as my duty towards my people, for my own satisfaction,” said Anasuya. “There is no support from the TRS government. I could do all this because of donations and support of like-minded individuals.”

References 

Women members of the Andhra Pradesh Legislative Assembly
1971 births
Living people
Indian National Congress politicians from Andhra Pradesh
Indian National Congress politicians from Telangana
All India Mahila Congress
Andhra Pradesh MLAs 2009–2014
Telangana MLAs 2018–2023
21st-century Indian women politicians